Disokkupati is a 1997 Italian sitcom created by Valentina Amurri, Linda Brunetta and Pier Francesco Loche, and directed by Franza Di Rosa.

Cast
Paolo Ferrari as Amelio Spina
Sabrina Impacciatore as Caterina
Pierfrancesco Loche as Ignazio Settimo Porcu
Adolfo Margiotta as Speranzo Zammataro
Stefano Masciarelli as Mario
Francesca Reggiani as Cesca
Antonio Catania as Osservatore di Pavia

See also
List of Italian television series

References

External links

Italian television series
1997 Italian television series debuts
RAI original programming